White-eyed bulbul may refer to the following species of birds:

 Cream-vented bulbul, found in south-eastern Asia
 White-spectacled bulbul, found in Turkey and the Middle East

Birds by common name